The Kyrgyzstan men's national junior ice hockey team is the men's national under-20 ice hockey team of Kyrgyzstan. The team is controlled by the Ice Hockey Federation of the Kyrgyz Republic, a member of the International Ice Hockey Federation. In December 2017 the team made their international debut at the 2018 IIHF U20 Challenge Cup of Asia where they finished second behind Malaysia.

History
The Kyrgyzstan men's national junior ice hockey team debuted at the 2018 IIHF U20 Challenge Cup of Asia in Kuala Lumpur, Malaysia. Their opening game of the tournament was against the Philippines which they won 12–4. Kyrgyzstan went on to win their games against India and the United Arab Emirates and lost their match against Malaysia. Kyrgyzstan finished the round-robin tournament in second place behind Malaysia who won all of their games. The win against India of 13–2 is currently the team's largest victory on record. Defenceman Oleg Pismakov was selected as best Kyrgyz player of the tournament.

International competitions
 2018 IIHF U20 Challenge Cup of Asia — 2nd overall
 2019 IIHF U20 Challenge Cup of Asia — 2nd overall
 2022 World Championships — 41st overall (7th in Division III)
2023 World Championships — 40th overall (6th in Division III)

References

Ice hockey in Kyrgyzstan
Junior national ice hockey teams
National ice hockey teams in Asia
Ice hockey